Arnall is a surname. Notable people with the surname include:

Ellis Arnall (1907–1992), American politician, 69th Governor of Georgia from 1943 to 1947
Julia Arnall (1928–2018), Austrian actress
Roland Arnall (1939–2008), French-born American businessman and diplomat
William Arnall (died 1736), English political writer

See also
Arnall Patz (1920–2010), American medical doctor and research professor at Johns Hopkins University
Arnall Middle School, middle school located in Newnan, Georgia but serves parts of Sharpsburg, Georgia

de:Arnall